Cathedral Street is a street in central Dublin, Ireland, formerly known as Elephant Lane and Tyrone Place.

Location 

Cathedral Street runs from O'Connell Street Upper to Marlborough Street. St Mary's Pro-Cathedral sits on the corner of Cathedral and Marlborough Streets.

History 
On 18th century maps of Dublin, this street is named Elephant Lane. McCready attributes this to a corruption of Mellifont Lane, Menagerie Lane, or due to the presence of a tavern on the street with a sign featuring an elephant. According to the 1850 New City Pictorial Directory, besides four vacant buildings, Elephant Lane's occupants included, a plumber, locksmith, job coach establishment, an ivory turner, two booksellers and two vintners. The street was later known as Tyrone Place from 1870 due to it leading to Tyrone House, and was renamed Cathedral Street in 1900.

The Post Office Tavern was at No.9 Elephant Lane and from 1854 run by a James Kenny until 1870 when he is the hotel and tavern keeper of the Post Office Hotel now noted to be in Tyrone Place. John Nagle is the proprietor of the establishment in 1875.

The historic house, Drogheda House, since demolished was on the corner of Cathedral Street and O'Connell Street, and dated from 1751. The eastern side of Cathedral Street survived the destruction of the Easter Rising in 1916 but was later destroyed during the Civil War in 1922.

Plans to refurbish Cathedral Street with Sackville Place to facilitate better pedestrian access between the Luas lines were scrapped in 2018.

See also
List of streets and squares in Dublin

References

Streets in Dublin (city)
Odonyms referring to a building
Odonyms referring to religion